EF Education First (abbreviated as EF) is an international education company that specializes in language training, educational travel, academic degree programs, and cultural exchange. The company was founded in 1965 by Bertil Hult in the Swedish university town of Lund. The company is privately held by the Hult family.

As of 2017, EF had approximately 52,000 employees in 116 countries.

The company has particular focus in China and other Asian markets under the brand name "English First".

History 
Bertil Hult dropped out of college to launch EF in 1969.  He had earlier dropped out of junior high and gone to work for a ship broker in London, where he learned English by immersion; he had been unable to learn it in school due to dyslexia.  The company started selling a French language course to Swedish students seeking to study in France, but he thought English was a bigger market and started offering services throughout Europe.  In 1972 a friend convinced him to open a school in Japan, just when English-language keyboards were introduced there, and the company experienced explosive growth. The company expanded to the US in 1983, first establishing headquarters in California and then in Boston in 1988.

Hult never took outside investment and instead grew the company through revenue. By 2014, EF had approximately 37,000 employees in 55 countries. By that time, Hut had stopped running the company and had passed leadership to his sons.

EF Learning Labs publishes the annual EF English Proficiency Index, a ranking of English language skills by country.

EF has developed a standardized English test called the EF Standard English Test.

The company also offers an e-learning program for adults called "EF English Live,"  which was formerly known as "EF Englishtown." EF English Live program has been certified for pedagogical quality by the Education Alliance Finland. Through a division called EF Tours, the company offers  educational tours, service learning tours, and conferences.

Sports

See also
 EF English Proficiency Index
 EF Standard English Test
 Hult International Business School
 Hult Prize

References

External links
 
 

 
International education industry
Education companies of Sweden
Education companies of Switzerland
Education companies established in 1965
Companies based in Lucerne
Companies based in Lund